Pedalium is a genus of plant in the Pedaliaceae family comprising one species, Pedalium murex. It is distributed in India, Sri Lanka and Tropical Africa.

Etymology
The genera name is derived from the Greek word pedalion meaning 'rudder of a ship'.

References

External links

 pharmacographia indica page 49
 flowers of india बडा गोखरू

Monotypic Lamiales genera
Pedaliaceae
Flora of Africa
Flora of Yemen
Flora of India (region)
Flora of Sri Lanka